Kenan Engin (1974, Pertek, Tunceli Province, Turkey) is a German-Kurdish political scientist.

Engin writes articles in Turkish, German and English for magazines and newspapers since 1995. He immigrated to Germany from Turkey in 2000 and studied at the University of Heidelberg, working there from 2009 onwards in addition to other posts at other universities.

Kenan Engin identified the Arab Spring as the "fifth wave of democracy" because of evident features qualitatively similar to the "third wave of democracy" in Latin America that took place in the 1970s and 1980s. His works have been well cited.

References

1974 births
Living people
People from Pertek
German political scientists
Turkish political scientists
Heidelberg University alumni